Millbourne  is a borough in Delaware County, Pennsylvania. As of the 2020 census, the population is 1,212. Millbourne borders Philadelphia along Cobbs Creek. The borough was the former site of the Sellers Family's Millbourne Mills. The name of Millbourne Mills comes from the word Mill and "bourne" meaning creek.  Millbourne students attend Upper Darby School District schools. Magisterial courts with presiding jurisdiction for Millbourne are also located in Upper Darby. Millbourne, at over 17,000 people per square mile, is the most densely populated incorporated place in Pennsylvania, and 24th in the entire United States.

History

Millbourne Mills 

Millbourne Borough was first occupied by Samuel Sellers. The land was used for living and farming for over half a century. His grandson, John Sellers, purchased plots of land in the borough.

Before Sellers' death in 1804, he devised his estates to his sons, Nathan, David, John, and George. Sellers devised a plan of grist and saw-mills to his son John, Jr. These mills were built before 1749.

The mills were owned by the elder Sellers and were operated by James Steel. James continued to operate the mill until 1805 when his son, Thomas Steel, took over. 

Thomas Steel purchased the Darby Mill in 1814. In that year, Sellers erected an old part of the now Millbourne Mill. John Jr., after learning the trade of a miller with Thomas Steel, took charge of the new mill.

A stream which empties into the Millbourne dam supplying the water to Millbourne Mills, in 1800, was an oil-mill, which continued until 1848. The old gristmill stood above the present mill. In 1820, it was used for grinding gypsum. As late as 1830, Augustus C. Jones was operating the old mill in grinding logwood, spices, etc. It was later discontinued. The new mill, built in 1814, was placed under the charge of John Sellers, Jr., and was fitted with all the improved machinery of that time.

Early 1900s 
Between 1906 and 1908 Samuel Shoemaker and John L. Fry saw the possibility of a community in Millbourne. Around 100 residential homes were later built.

In 1907 the Market Street “L” was completed for transportation and on July 1, 1908, the Millbourne Station was officially opened.

On September 21, 1909, Millbourne Fire House was completed. The Millbourne Police Department was also established within the same time period.

On October 12, 1909, Millbourne was separated from Upper Darby Township and was incorporated into a Borough. The first council members included John T. Brosnan, Henry A. Shourds, W. H. Lightner, S. F. Wise, L. E. Upham, and E. J. Hawkins.

Sears Roebuck & Co. 
Later, a Sears Roebuck & Co. department store was built in 1925 and was located on a plot of land at the northeastern end of Millbourne on what is commonly thought to be a flood plain for Cobbs Creek. The Sears department store, through mercantile tax, provided approximately half of the Borough's revenues. It was relocated to the corner of Walnut Street and 69th Street in Upper Darby in 1988. The vacant building was demolished in 2000. The relocation caused significant financial difficulties for the borough.

Geography

Typography 
Millbourne Borough is located at  (39.963735, -75.252615).

According to the United States Census Bureau, the borough has a total area of 0.1 square miles (0.2 km2), all land, making it the smallest municipality in Delaware County, Pennsylvania by area.

The Borough is approximately bounded on the north and east by Cobbs Creek, and on the south by Market Street. Across Cobbs Creek to the north lies an extension of Fairmount Park and the Cobbs Creek Golf Course.

Darby Creek is located within southeastern Pennsylvania and flows into the Delaware River. The entire area of the watershed is 78 mi2 (202.019 km2) which Milbourne is inside of. The watershed drains through the John Heinz National Wildlife Refuge and the Delaware River.

Climate 
On the Köppen climate classification, Millbourne has a Humid subtropical climate (Cfa). Millbourne has warm-wet summers and very cold-snowy winters. The temperature usually varies from 26 °F to 86 °F and is rarely above 13 °F or above 94 °F.

The hottest month of the year is July with an average high of above 77 °F. The coldest month of the year is January with an average high of below 49 °F.

Landmarks

Cobbs Creek 

A common place of interest, Cobbs Creek is located near Millbourne. The creek is commonly used for swimming and fishing. The creek is also connected to the Cobbs Creek trail which is used for hiking and biking. The Cobbs Creek Bikeway runs from a corner at the eastern end of Millbourne, 63rd and Market Streets, to approximately 86th and Cobbs Creek Parkway. It is used by walkers and bicyclists as well as occasional all-terrain vehicles. Plans existed to eventually connect this bikeway to the John Heinz National Wildlife Refuge.

Philadelphia Sikhi Society 
A gurdwara is located on Garden Court. Since the 1990s, it has Millbourne's only place of worship. The gurdwara offers prayer services every Sunday and Friday. In 2011, the gurdwara raised relief funds for the 2011 Tōhoku earthquake and tsunami. Around 1,500 Sikhis from the region visit the gurdwara.

Economy and development

Development 
In 2012, a development plan was created for the vacant 18-acre plot of land that originally hosted Sears. It included multiple retail stores and anchors, housing units and apartments, and new townhall. The plan was scrapped in later years. As of 2022, a Service and Logistics Center for the Children's Hospital of Philadelphia is being constructed. The new center will create new jobs and will be state of the art.

There were plans for a rail-with-trail bike path along SEPTA's Route 100 line from Radnor to 69th Street.

Grants 
Throughout the years, Millbourne has received grants to improve the borough. This included grants to improve the heart of the borough, local recycling and leaf collection programs, develop the Service and Logistics Center for the Children's Hospital of Philadelphia, and for planning around Millbourne Station to attract new businesses.

Financially distressed municipality 

Millbourne was designated a financially distressed municipality on January 7, 1993, by the state of Pennsylvania. The Borough had a status as a "blighted" community in 2006. Later, the borough was removed from the financially distressed municipality list on October 21, 2014. This was after a successful campaign by former mayor Thomas Kramer. Millbourne hadn't overspent its budget in 5 years and the borough even went as far as to use goats to remove weeds.

Culture

Diversity 
In 2010, 30% of Millbourne residents identified themselves as being of Asian Indian heritage. The borough is often considered a "Little India" due to this large Indian presence. Most residents stay for a few years before moving to other places, after they become financially stable.

Annually, a festival is held in Millbourne on Wister Drive. The Bangladeshi Festival of Millbourne  is a daylong celebration of Bangladeshi culture filled with music and food. Barbecue, pop-up shops and music are typical at these events.

Art 
Millbourne Station is decorated with iridescent peacock feathers. The project, designed by Erland + Kaman in 2009, is called "Paradise." It is an homage to the diverse culture of Millbourne and its people from the Indian sub-continent. There is also a mural located next to the station via a narrow passageway. The mural project was sponsored by City Year in the 2000s.

Food 
A myriad of ethnic grocery stores is also within easy walking distance, allowing residents to buy a wide range of Punjabi foods, Indian foods, Halal chicken and lamb, a wide range of Asian greens, Japanese, Chinese and Korean-made foods, Central American foods, and mainstream American foods within minutes of their homes. Most of these businesses are located in 69th Street, which is 0.5 miles (0.804672 km) from Millbourne.

Government

Politics 
For decades, Millbourne was a Republican majority. But due to a large arrival of immigrants, in recent years Millbourne became Democratic.

Republican majority 
Joseph Artmont Sr., his son Joseph Artmont Jr., and his Republican allies were replaced with a more diverse array of council members. In the 2000s, Thomas Kramer became the last remaining Republican in the Milbourne Council. In the 2009 general elections, Thomas Kramer won 126 to 58 from then mayor William Donovan Jr.

Current day 
In 2021, Mahabubul Tayub Alam was elected mayor of Millbourne. A total of 165 votes were cast to his name. The Borough is currently Democratic in terms of registration. As of February 2022, The Millbourne Council members consist of Mayor Mahabubul Tayub Alam, Council President Alauddin Patwary, Vice President MD Nurul Hasan, Councilman Rafikul Islam Jibon, Councilman MD Munsur Ali, and Councilman Mosharraf Hossain.

Public safety 
The borough maintains its own police department, which provides frequent coverage of each street. The borough had a fire department until it was shut down in 2019. Millbourne has a Town Watch, a volunteer organization run in cooperation with the police department.

Demographics

As of the 2020 Census, the racial makeup of the borough was 7.1% White, 20% African American, 0.1% Native American, 63.2% Asian, 0.2% Native Hawaiian and Other Pacific Islander, 6.2% from other races, and 3.3% from two or more races. Hispanic or Latino of any race is 6.5% of the population. 63.8% of the borough's population were foreign-born.

In Census 2010, the racial makeup of the borough was 13.7% White, 20.1% African American, 0.6% Native American, 56.3% Asian, 0.9% Native Hawaiian and Other Pacific Islander, 4.1% from other races, and 4.2% from two or more races. Hispanic or Latino of any race were 8.5% of the population. 56.5% of the borough's population was foreign-born.

In Census 2000, there were 943 people, 366 households, and 214 families residing in the borough. The population density was 16,557 people per square mile (5,201.3/km2). There were 420 housing units at an average density of 6,123.7 per square mile (2,316.6/km2). The racial makeup of the borough was 21.31% White, 17.18% African American, 0.21% Native American, 54.29% Asian, 2.55% from other races, and 4.45% from two or more races. Hispanic or Latino of any race were 6.04% of the population.

As of Census 2020, There are 346 households, out of which 24.3% had children under the age of 18 living with them, 63.6% were married couples living together, 10.4% had a female householder with no spouse present, and 24% had a male householder with no spouse present. The average family size is 3.64.

In the borough, the population is spread out. 24.3% under the age of 18, 75.7% 18 years of age or older and 9% who were 65 years of age or older. The median age was 31 years.

The median income for a household in the borough was $45,800, and the median income for a family was $44,732. The per capita income for the borough was $15,752. About 7.8% of families and 10.9% of the population were below the poverty line, including 9.0% of those under age 18 and 16.9% of those age 65 or over.

Infrastructure

Transportation

Roads 

Pennsylvania Route 3 is the only numbered highway serving Millbourne. It follows Market Street along an east-west alignment, acting as Millbourne's southern border.

Roads within the borough are maintained by the Millbourne council. Residents within the borough pay for parking permits. There are also parking meters located alongside Wister Drive and Chatham Road. In Delaware County, motorists are able to pay for parking though mobile applications.

Public transportation 

Millbourne station is located at the end of Sellers Ave. The station goes westbound to 69th Street Transportation Center and eastbound to Frankford Transportation Center. The station, located on the Market-Frankford Line, was rebuilt and rededicated in mid-2007. There was a PhillyCarShare shared car "node" in Millbourne before the company's acquisition by Enterprise Holdings.

Utilities 
Recycling is available every Wednesday in the borough using specially designed yellow-bins. Regular trash-pick-up is available every Thursday and Friday.

Electricity to the borough is provided by the PECO Energy Company. Water Serivices is provided by Aqua America.

ADSL, Cable, Fiber, Fixed Wireless and Satellite internet technology is available in Millbourne. Comcast Cable Communications, LLC provides the majority of cable internet to residents in the area. 5G in the area is commercially available from Verizon Wireless, AT&T Mobility, and T-Mobile.

References

External links

 Millbourne Borough
 Delaware County, Pennsylvania
 Millbourne Borough Police Department - Archive from December 28, 2013
 Niche
 Delaware County History - Historical maps of Millbourne
 Temple University Libraries - Historical resources of Millbourne



Asian-American culture in Pennsylvania
Populated places established in 1722
Boroughs in Delaware County, Pennsylvania
Little Indias